Robert Broadbridge (christened 22 June 1797) was an English professional cricketer who played first-class cricket from 1822 to 1824.  He was mainly associated with Sussex and made 4 known appearances in first-class matches, including 1 for The Bs.

References

1797 births
Date of death unknown
English cricketers
English cricketers of 1787 to 1825
Sussex cricketers
Year of death missing
The Bs cricketers